The Apache Railway  is an Arizona short-line railroad that operates from a connection with the BNSF Railway  at Holbrook to the Snowflake Mill near Snowflake, Arizona, .  The APA was acquired by Catalyst Paper from Abitibi Consolidated in 2008. The Snowflake paper mill shut down permanently on September 30, 2012. In late 2015, the railway was purchased out of bankruptcy by a group including Aztec Land & Cattle Company and Midwest Poultry Producers, L.P., thereby avoiding a shutdown and scrappage of the line.  The railway continues to operate, and its revenues are driven primarily by car repair and storage. The railway's freight revenues have not yet recovered from the shutdown of the Snowflake paper mill then owned by Catalyst, although efforts to enhance them continue.

Traffic
16,000 cars per year (1996 figure)
 recycled fiber
 pulpwood
 wood chips
 coal
 paper
 chemicals
 grain

History
The Apache Railway was incorporated in 1917, when it began construction of a rail line from Holbrook south, reaching Snowflake in 1918.  It was extended south to McNary in 1920.

From October 1, 1931, until 1936, amid the Great Depression, the APA was placed in receivership.

A tourist railroad, the White Mountain Scenic Railroad, operated steam powered passenger excursions over the Southwest Forest Industries-owned line from McNary to the logging camp of Maverick, AZ, beginning in 1964. As track conditions deteriorated, the excursions were cut back in later years to a point about half way to Maverick. In the final years, it operated north from Pinetop Lakes to a place called Bell Siding on U.S. Route 60. In 1976, the White Mountain Scenic Railroad ceased operations and moved its equipment to Heber City, Utah to be used on an excursion there known as the "Heber Creeper." The line from Maverick to McNary, with some elevations exceeding , was removed in 1982 after the McNary sawmill closed.

By the 1980s, the Apache Railway was Arizona's only remaining logging railroad.  The track from Snowflake to McNary was abandoned in 1982.

In July 2012, the owner of the railroad and an on-line paper mill, Catalyst Paper, announced that the mill and railroad would shut down and be sold later in the year. In December, Catalyst agreed to sell the railroad and mill to Hackman Capital. Hackman planned to dismantle the railroad along with the mill, but local officials who wanted to retain rail service formed a non-profit foundation to purchase the railroad from lenders, using  a federal Railroad Rehabilitation and Improvement Financing loan, which was denied in November 2014.  Hackman took over control again and put the railroad into bankruptcy in May 2015, while local officials attempted to secure a rural economic development loan from the USDA. A bankruptcy court ruled on September 1, 2015, to postpone the sale deadline of the railroad, which the court valued at $7.2 million, until November 30.

Passenger service
The Apache Railway offered passenger service until the 1950s. In July 1954, the mixed train operated on Mondays, Wednesdays and Fridays, departing McNary at 7:15am, arriving Holbrook at 12:15pm, departing there at 1:30pm and returning to McNary at 7:00pm.

Motive power
The Apache Railway uses ALCO Century 420 (C420) and C424s.

Current Roster:

APA 81 - C420

APA 82 - C420

APA 83 - C420

APA 84 - C420

APA 97 - M424

APA 98 - M424

APA 99 - M424

Route

 Holbrook (interchange with BNSF Railway's Gallup Subdivision/formerly Atchison, Topeka and Santa Fe Railway)
 Blair
 Snowflake Pig Farm
 Tours
 Snowflake Junction
 Apache Railway Shops
 Snowflake Paper Mill (Catalyst Paper)
 Snowflake Junction
 Snowflake

Abandoned routes
Abandoned in 1980.
 Snowflake (interchange with the now defunct Standard Lumber)
 Taylor
 Silver Lake
 Bell Siding
 Sponseller (with several lumber spurs into the forest to the east)
 Pinetop Lakes (with several lumber spurs into the forest)
 McNary (interchange with Southwest Forest Industries)
 Camp 28 (with several lumber spurs into the forest)

In addition, a 2 to 3 mile (3–5 km) section of track used to run from south of Tours to Snowflake.  Today's line runs from Tours to Snowflake Junction.

References

Further reading

External links

Arizona railroads
Railway companies established in 1917
Catalyst Paper
American companies established in 1917